Heavy Iron Studios, Inc. is an American video game developer based in Manhattan Beach, California. It was founded in August 1999 within THQ after the publisher acquired Steve Gray's Chemistry Entertainment. As part of a series of cost reductions within THQ, Heavy Iron Studios was spun off as an independent company in June 2009. Keywords Studios acquired the developer in January 2021.

History 
Early during his career, Steve Gray worked for the visual effects companies Robert Abel and Associates, Rhythm & Hues, and Digital Domain. As Digital Domain was trying to get into the video game industry, Gray and the company's chief financial officer, Chris McKibbin, pitched their services to various larger video game companies. Although they were turned down due to Digital Domain's lack of experience in the field, Gray and McKibbin were offered positions at the game developer, EA Canada, which both accepted. Gray quickly discovered his dislike the studio's sports games and soon switched to Square USA, where he managed the development team for Parasite Eve. As the game was completed, Gray and several of the game's developers believed they could easily obtain publishing contracts from outside companies if they set up their own studio. In 1997, Gray established Chemistry Entertainment. The studio worked on several unreleased games, including a Godzilla game for Electronic Arts. Chemistry Entertainment was briefly part of Rainmaker Entertainment Group, which also housed Rainmaker Digital Effects, as Rainmaker Interactive. Eventually, the studio landed a deal with THQ for a game based on the Evil Dead franchise. Gray sold his studio to THQ, which then established Heavy Iron Studios as an internal developer on August 31, 1999. The finished game, Evil Dead: Hail to the King, was released in late 2000.

Following significant financial losses at THQ, the company announced that it would spin off several of its developers, including Heavy Iron Studios. The studio's independence was effective on June 1, 2009. Through a series of layoffs, its headcount was reduced from 120 to 60 by December. The acquisition was complete on January 13, 2021.

Games developed

Games co-developed

Cancelled games

References

External links
 

1999 establishments in California
2021 mergers and acquisitions
American companies established in 1999
American subsidiaries of foreign companies
Companies based in Los Angeles
Keywords Studios
THQ
Video game companies established in 1999
Video game companies of the United States
Video game development companies